Thunderbirds is a 1952 war film directed by John H. Auer and starring John Derek, John Drew Barrymore, Mona Freeman, Gene Evans, Eileen Christy and Ward Bond. It features the exploits of the 45th Infantry Division in the Italian campaign of World War II. The film was made by Republic Pictures with sequences filmed at Fort Sill, Oklahoma.

Plot
Close friends Gil Hackett and Tom McCreary both love and leave the same girl, Mary Caldwell, after they are called up to the Oklahoma National Guard and then on to the Army for wartime duty in 1940.

A tough, stoic sergeant named Logan keeps an eye on them as the unit ships out to Europe following the Japanese attack on Pearl Harbor. Tom speaks of his father, who supposedly died a hero's death in the First World War, but another soldier claims he's heard that Tom's father was disgraced and dishonorably discharged.

Mary reveals that Tom is the one she loves. Gil finds solace in meeting Lt. Ellen Henderson, an army nurse. The fighting continues in Sicily and when Tom ends up missing, Logan will not permit a search. Logan later heroically reports a movement of German tanks just before being shot.

With the invasion of Southern France at hand, it is learned that Logan had been court-martialed during World War I for authorizing a search party that led to the death of more soldiers. He reenlisted under a false name to prove himself again, particularly to Tom, who is actually his son.

Cast
 John Derek as Lt. Gil Hacket 
 John Barrymore Jr. as Pvt. Tom McCreery (as John Barrymore Jr.)
 Mona Freeman as Lt. Ellen Henderson
 Gene Evans as Sgt. Mike Braggart 
 Eileen Christy as Mary Caldwell
 Ward Bond as Lt. John McCreery
 Barton MacLane as Sgt. Durkee  
 Wally Cassell as Pfc. Sam Jacobs  
 Ben Cooper  as Calvin Jones
 Scott Elliott as Keith Watson (as Robert Neil)
 Slim Pickens as Pvt. Wes Shelby
 Armando Silvestre as Cpl. Ralph Mogay
 Norman Budd as Pvt. Lou Radtke
 Mae Clarke as Mrs. Jones
 Sammy McKim as Cpl. Ray Hanford (as Sam McKim)
 Allene Roberts as Margie Hanford 
 Richard Simmons as Capt. Norton
 Walter Reed as Lt. Hammond
 Suzanne Dalbert as Marie Etienne
 Barbara Pepper as Mrs. Louise Braggart
 Pepe Hern as Pvt. Jim Lastchance
 Victor Millan as Pvt. Joe Lastchance

References

External links

1952 films
American black-and-white films
Italian Campaign of World War II films
Republic Pictures films
Films scored by Victor Young
Films directed by John H. Auer
American war films
1952 war films
1950s English-language films
1950s American films